Gorman Township is a township in Otter Tail County, Minnesota, United States. The population was 398 at the 2000 census.

History
Gorman Township was organized in 1873, and named for John O. Gorman, an early settler.

Geography

Demographics
As of the census of 2000, there were 398 people, 150 households, and 115 families living in the township.  The population density was 12.2 people per square mile (4.7/km2).  There were 244 housing units at an average density of 7.5/sq mi (2.9/km2).  The racial makeup of the township was 95.48% White, 0.25% Native American, 2.51% Pacific Islander, and 1.76% from two or more races. Hispanic or Latino of any race were 2.51% of the population.

There were 150 households, out of which 33.3% had children under the age of 18 living with them, 70.7% were married couples living together, 2.7% had a female householder with no husband present, and 23.3% were non-families. 20.7% of all households were made up of individuals, and 6.7% had someone living alone who was 65 years of age or older.  The average household size was 2.65 and the average family size was 3.09.

In the township the population was spread out, with 26.6% under the age of 18, 7.8% from 18 to 24, 26.1% from 25 to 44, 28.4% from 45 to 64, and 11.1% who were 65 years of age or older.  The median age was 38 years. For every 100 females, there were 117.5 males.  For every 100 females age 18 and over, there were 113.1 males.

The median income for a household in the township was $48,750, and the median income for a family was $49,464. Males had a median income of $30,833 versus $20,250 for females. The per capita income for the township was $20,466.  About 5.3% of families and 4.6% of the population were below the poverty line, including 4.9% of those under age 18 and 13.7% of those age 65 or over.

References

Townships in Otter Tail County, Minnesota
Townships in Minnesota